Phan Quang Đán (6 November 1918 – 26 March 2004) was a Vietnamese political opposition figure who was one of only two non-government politicians who won a seat in the 1959 South Vietnamese election for the National Assembly. Subsequently, he was arrested by the forces of President Ngô Đình Diệm and not allowed to take his seat. The most prominent dissident during the rule of Diệm, he is remembered more for his incarceration than his activities after Diệm's fall, when he became a cabinet minister.

Trained as a doctor, Đán first entered politics in 1945 when the Japanese occupation of Vietnam ended and several local groups challenged French attempts to re-establish colonial power. Đán briefly joined several political parties and started his newspaper account, turning down offers of a cabinet position from the communist-dominated Việt Minh to assist former Emperor Bao Dai as an advisor and briefly as Minister of Information before resigning, citing French reluctance to allow actual autonomy. He then completed a PhD at Harvard University while continuing his activism from afar, writing several political treatises.

Upon returning to South Vietnam, Đán was involved in negotiations with Diệm, but did not join the government, and then became the centre of open opposition to Diệm, starting the Democratic Opposition Bloc and the Thời Luận newspaper, which stridently criticised the government. Despite ransackings by a mob of regime supporters, the newspaper's closure by a government court, and his blacklisting from university employment, Đán continued his opposition activities and was elected to the National Assembly in 1959, but was prevented from taking his seat. He then joined the paratroopers' coup of 1960 as a spokesperson after it started and was then jailed in a labour camp when Diệm loyalists crushed the revolt. Đán was released in 1963 upon Diệm's overthrow and assassination, and went on to become Foreign Minister and Deputy Prime Minister before escaping Vietnam during the Fall of Saigon.

Early years 
Phan Quang Đán hailed from the north central province of Xiangkhouang Province in Laos. He studied for a period in a seminary, and was an American trained OSS (now CIA) agent during the Second World War. He studied medicine in Hanoi when he entered politics in 1945 following the collapse of the Japanese occupation. This ushered in a period of political ferment as Ho Chi Minh and his Viet Minh proclaimed the creation of the Democratic Republic of Vietnam and battled French Union forces who attempted to regain control of the country. He briefly joined the Vietnamese People's Party and the Great Vietnam Civil Servants Party before forming a newspaper based group named "Thiết Thực". According to his account, he twice turned down Vietminh offers of a cabinet position in 1946 to follow Emperor Bảo Đại to China and Hong Kong. There during 1947 and 1948, he was an advisor as Bảo Đại attempted to negotiate a return to Vietnam with the French. When a Provisional Central Government was established in 1948 with Bảo Đại's blessing, Dan joined it as Minister of Information. He resigned after several months, citing the French reluctance to grant the government any powers to facilitate Vietnamese autonomy, noting that they wanted to ‘reestablish the old colonial regime’. During this period working for Bao Dai, Dan worked closely with Nghiêm Xuân Thiện. The pair were both members of the Viet Nam Quoc Dan Dang and later worked on the Thoi Luan newspaper together. In 1949, Dan formed his own group, the Republican Party (Cong Hoa Dang) and went abroad to study for his PhD at the Harvard School of Public Health while continuing his political activities. In 1951, he published his political treatise Volonté Vietnamienne, articulating his vision for an independent non-Communist Vietnam. This included multiparty democratic elections. His political activities spread to his academic work; his thesis Vietnam’s Health: Present Conditions and Proposals of Reorganization, had references to Vietnam’s political future. According to Cao Van Luan, a Catholic priest who served in academic posts under Diem’s regime and was a former seminary colleague of Dan, Diem and Dan were in contact while the pair were in political exile in the US in the 1950s. Luan was of the opinion that Diem, who was appointed Prime Minister by Bao Dai in 1954, assumed that Dan was receptive to him as a politician. In August 1955, one month before returning to Vietnam, Dan published a Vietnamese translation of Volonté Vietnamienne.

The reason for Dan's exclusion from further Bảo Đại and then Ngo Dinh Diem cabinets is disputed. Dan said that it was due to Diem being appointed by Bảo Đại, but the government maintained that it was because he was holding out for a more important ministry, having allegedly rejected an offer to become the Minister for Social Welfare. For his part, Dan later claimed that he rebuffed Diem because he ‘never intended to cooperate with Diệm’, who he asserted could not administer a government that could modernise Vietnam in a democratic manner, but instead was set on feudal and nepotistic rule. Dan claimed that upon his return to Vietnam in September 1955, Diem’s officials sought him out at the airport to arrange a meeting at the Norodom Palace. Dan claimed that he reprimanded Diem for running a nepotistic regime and relying on the counsel of his younger brother Ngo Dinh Nhu, and stated his intention to contribute to South Vietnamese politics by organising ‘a constructive, legal opposition’. According to the historian Jason Picard, Diem viewed Dan’s publications and remarks as disrespectful and a challenge to his political authority.

Diem era career 

In October, Diem proclaimed himself the President of the newly proclaimed Republic of Vietnam after defeating Bao Dai in a fraudulent referendum and from then on, Dan was the centre of much of the open opposition to Diem's regime. First he headed a coalition of opposition groups which fought the government's arrangements for the 1956 election of a Constituent Assembly. The coalition had three component groups with government approval: The National Restoration League, the Socialist Party and the Social Democratic Party. Three months after the elections for the Constituent Assembly, the coalition collapsed when the leaders of the first two parties were jailed and the third party threatened into dissolution. Dan was briefly arrested on the eve of the 1956 elections, and accused by government controlled media of involvement in communist and colonialist activities. He had penned a letter to Diem in which he accused the regime of using dictatorial methods. He was then sacked under secret government orders from his position at The University of Saigon Faculty of Medicine, and blacklisted from holding academic positions at universities and placed under continuous police surveillance.

Undeterred, he continued his political activities and in May 1957 formed another opposition coalition called the Democratic Opposition Bloc (Khối Dân Chủ Đối Lập). At its launch, he stated ‘Two fundamental weaknesses facing the southern regime today are the total absence of an independent press and an opposition camp both recognized and tolerated by the ruling authority’, and stated that they would for the promotion of democratic processes in South Vietnam.

The group had their own newspaper, the Thời Luận, which was revamped to coincide with the launch of the new party. These announcements were timed to coincide with Diem’s Diem’s state visit to the US,  provoking an angry reaction in private from the president. Over the next year until its shutdown, Thời Luận became the most popular newspaper in the country, averaging around 100,000 copies per issue, which was quadruple the circulation of rival newspapers. It sold in the capital Saigon and was distributed through the black market across the country, trumpeting itself as the outlet of those who could not speak. It stated its purpose as:

The newspaper generated attention for its open and combative criticism of Diem’s regime.

Its office was ransacked by a government organised mob in September 1957, and was closed down in March 1958 by a government court order. Dan withdrew from the Democratic Bloc in April 1958 and the group collapsed as Dan sought to set up the Free Democratic Party and permission to publish a newspaper. Neither applications were approved, and various members of Dan's party were arrested for their political activities. In 1959, two newspapers were shut down after they published Dan's articles.

Dan openly criticized the main platform of American economic development aid to South Vietnam, the Commercial Import Program. This allowed licensed importers to buy US dollars at rates far lower than the official exchange rate, and then buy American goods with it. Instead of importing capital goods to fuel industrialization, the money was mostly spent on consumer goods to create an urban upper-class loyal to the government. Dan said "The U.S. Commercial Import Program—which costs us nothing—brings in on a massive scale luxury goods of all kinds, which give us an artificial society—enhanced material conditions that don't amount to anything, and no sacrifice; it brings luxury to our ruling group and middle class, and luxury means corruption."

Election and disbarring 

On 30 August 1959, Dan ran for the National Assembly in a constituency in Saigon and was elected by a 6-1 ratio over Diem's government candidate. This came despite 8000 Army of the Republic of Vietnam soldiers being bussed from out of district to stuff ballot boxes to support the government candidate. He was regarded as a nationalist anti-communist who was one of the most able political figures in the country.

Despite strong protests from the US and UK embassies, Diem was adamant that Dan would not be able to take his seat. When the Assembly was inaugurated, Dan was confronted by police and put under arrest as he attempted to leave his medical clinic to attend the session. Dan was charged with electoral fraud, on the grounds that he supposedly offered free medical care to induce voters to support him. He also pointed out that if this were the case, then he would have run for election in the district in which his practice was located, to maximise the number of patients who were in his voting district.

Imprisonment 

In November 1960, ARVN paratroopers attempted a coup against Diem. As the attempt unfolded, Dan agreed to become a spokesperson for the coup leaders. He cited political mismanagement of the war against the Vietcong and the government's refusal to broaden its political base as the reason for the revolt. Dan spoke on Radio Vietnam and staged a media conference during which a rebel paratrooper pulled a portrait of the president from the wall, ripped it and stamped on it.

However, the plot leaders stalled their coup when Diem falsely promised reform. Diem then crushed the rebels and Dan was arrested, tortured and sentenced to eight years of hard labour in the penal colony on Poulo Condore where the French had once imprisoned Vietnamese nationalists. Were it not for western protests, Diem would have had Dan executed. As a result of the successful coup in 1963 in which Diem was deposed and assassinated, Dan was released from prison.  Đán was garlanded and taken to military headquarters.

Later career 
In 1966 he was elected to the Constituent Assembly and unsuccessfully contested the 1967 Presidential election. He then became foreign affairs minister and later the deputy Prime Minister for social welfare and refugees. His most prominent role was to resettle thousands of displaced war victims and refugees. When South Vietnam fell in 1975, Dan left for the United States.

See also
Operation Frequent Wind

Notes

References
 

Harvard Medical School alumni
Vietnamese emigrants to the United States
Vietnamese anti-communists
1918 births
2004 deaths
South Vietnamese politicians
Government ministers of Vietnam
Members of the National Assembly (South Vietnam)
South Vietnamese prisoners and detainees
South Vietnamese dissidents
Laotian emigrants to Vietnam
Vietnamese Roman Catholics